The Führer and the Tramp is an Alternate history graphic novel by Sean McArdle and Jon Judy published in 2021 by Source Point Press. The book tells the story of Charlie Chaplin fighting Adolf Hitler and the Nazis while filming The Great Dictator.

Publication history
In 2015, McArdle, Judy and Wee began work on the graphic novel, which was self-published via Kickstarter four years later in 2019. In 2020, Source Point Press released the comic as a five-issue mini series.  It was collected as a graphic novel in 2021.

Plot
The year is 1939, and Charlie Chaplin is mistaken for a Jew while attending the Berlin premiere of the Leni Riefenstahl film Olympia. While attempting to flee the Nazi police, Chaplin disrupts the screening and embarrasses Adolf Hitler.

After returning to Hollywood, Chaplin is encouraged to complete his political satire comedy-drama film, The Great Dictator, by Franklin Delano Roosevelt Jr. Roosevelt assigns two of his Undercover agents, Errol Flynn and Hedy Lamarr to help Chaplin finish his movie, and to help protect him from Nazi saboteurs.

In order to hide from the saboteurs, Chaplin, Lamarr and Flynn sail to London on Flynn's yacht, the Zaca. Upon reaching their destination, they begin shooting at Pinewood Studios, aided by Alfred Hitchcock. The filming is interrupted by the Bombing of London, and the kidnapping of Charlie's brother, Sydney Chaplin.

The trio plan to rescue Sydney from Hitler's secret base, and employ the covert British team, The Ministry of Ungentlemanly Warfare. The team consists of Ian Fleming, Christopher Lee, Josephine Baker and Jon Pertwee. After rescuing Sydney, and uncovering Hitler's plans for the Holocaust, the group escape via a blimp captained by Hitchcock.

The book ends with a prelude showing all of the major characters attending the premiere of The Great Dictator.

Main characters

Charlie Chaplin
Hedy Lamarr
Errol Flynn
Adolf Hitler
Sydney Chaplin
Franklin Delano Roosevelt Jr.
Leni Riefenstahl
Alfred Hitchcock   
Ian Fleming
Christopher Lee 
Josephine Baker
Jon Pertwee

Reception
The Führer and the Tramp received considerable attention in the comics and mainstream book press; it was extremely well received and was nominated for an Eisner (see below).

Jason Stacks at Comics Bulletin said, “The Fuhrer and the Tramp was one of the most fun surprises I’ve had this year. I had no idea what to expect from this oddball concept, but this turned out to be a perfect end-of-summer blockbuster."

Fanbase Press said, "All in all, this is a great, highly entertaining comic. If you’re a fan of classic Hollywood, action comedies, and good, old-fashioned Nazi fighting, you’ll definitely want to check out The Fuhrer and the Tramp."

Paul at The Pullbox said of the digital comic, "This was one of my favorite reads, my favorite titles, and I hope to have a hardcopy of it sitting on my bookshelf sometime in the future."

Steve Leitman at Reading with a Flight Ring said, 'There is a lot to like about this and there is a lot of promise of what's to come. It is an interesting premise with delightful takes on film stars of days past wrapped up in some stellar interiors."

Awards and recognition
In 2019 The Führer and the Tramp was nominated for an Eisner Award for Best Digital Comic.

References

Alternate history comics
Crossover comics
Comics set in the 1930s
Comics based on films
Comics set in the 1940s
Comics set during World War II
Comics set in London
Comic strips based on real people
Comic strips set in the United States
Cultural depictions of Charlie Chaplin
Cultural depictions of Alfred Hitchcock
Cultural depictions of Adolf Hitler
Cultural depictions of Errol Flynn
Cultural depictions of Leni Riefenstahl
Cultural depictions of Franklin D. Roosevelt
Cultural depictions of Josephine Baker